Willem Adriaan van Ravesteijn (Amsterdam, 2 April 1938 – Laren, North Holland, 6 January 2015) was a Dutch gallerist and art collectors in the Netherlands.
 He and Geert van Beijeren founded the leading Dutch art gallery Art & Project (1968–2001) and publishers of the art magazine of the same name (1968–1989). During its thirty-year existence, the gallery as well as the magazine made substantial contributions to the Dutch art climate.

Biography 
Van Ravesteijn studied architecture at Delft University of Technology around 1960. He shared and interest in modern art with his friend Geert van Beijeren. In the mid-sixties they were both regular customers of Amsterdam's only contemporary art gallery with an international outlook, the Gallery Swart of Riekje Swart at Keizersgracht.

In Van Beijeren's parental home in Amsterdam-Zuid in September 1968 the both of them opened their own gallery, named Art & Project, were Van Ravesteijn took upon himself the day-to-day running of the gallery. The managed to attract artists, such as Gilbert & George, Sol LeWitt, Daniel Buren, and Lawrence Weiner.

Soon afterwards the opening of the gallery, the both of them managed to publish the first issue of Art & Project Bulletin, which would continue until 1989. It was in that year that the gallery moved from Amsterdam to Slootdorp, a small village north of Amsterdam. In December 2001 the gallery closed down.

In June 2014 Van Ravesteijn was awarded a knighthood in the Order of Orange-Nassau.

Art collection "depot VBVR" 
In 1965, Van Beijeren and Van Ravesteijn (VBVR) began putting together a collection of contemporary art. The history of the collection, which was later dubbed "Depot VBVR", largely coincided with that of the Art & Project gallery and magazine.

The emphasis lay on Conceptual Art, Land Art and Minimal Art. Artists that were represented in the collection included Alan Charlton, Francesco Clemente, Adam Colton, Tony Cragg, Ad Dekkers, Ger van Elk, Barry Flanagan, Gilbert & George, Richard Long, Keith Milow, Juan Muñoz, Nicholas Pope, Peter Struycken, David Tremlett, Richard Venlet, Carel Visser and Leo Vroegindeweij.

The largest part of the collection, approximately a thousand works, has been gradually handed over to the Rijksmuseum Twenthe in Enschedé. Other Dutch museums that received loans from the Van Beijeren-Van Ravesteijn collection are: the Gemeentemuseum in The Hague, the Museum Boijmans van Beuningen in Rotterdam and the Kröller-Müller Museum in Otterlo. In 2008, after the death of Geert van Beijeren, the Museum of Modern Art in New York City received a collection of some 230 prints, books, posters, photographs and other ephemera from Art & Project co-founder Adriaan van Ravesteijn. The gallery's archives and the owners' personal archives are kept at the Netherlands Institute for Art History (RKD).

In 2009 the Museum of Modern Art staged an exhibition entitled "In & Out of Amsterdam", drawing largely on the Van Ravesteijn-Van Beijeren bequest.

Gift to the Kröller-Müller Museum 
In 2013 Van Ravesteijn donated a significant part of the Art & Project collection to the Kröller-Müller Museum. This donation contained over 200 works of art, mostly sculptural works by Dutch artists such as Ger van Elk, Jos Kruit, Carel Visser and Leo Vroegindeweij, and international artists as Carl Andre, Adam Colton, Tony Cragg, Barry Flanagan, Hamish Fulton,  Richard Long, Andrew Lord, Juan Muñoz, Willy Ørskov and Nicholas Pope.

Publications, a selection 
 Adriaan van Ravesteijn, Andrew Lord: Nieuwe Sculptuur, Rijksmuseum Twenthe, Enschede 2003.

Further reading 
 Ton Geerts, 'Interview with Adriaan van Ravesteijn on the Art & Project Bulletins, May 17, 2011', in: L. Riley-Smith (ed.), Art & Project Bulletins 1-156, September 1968-November 1989, Londen 2011, p. 63-84
 Rini Dippel, 'Art & Project: The Early Years'. In: Christophe Cherix (ed.), In & Out of Amsterdam: Travels in Conceptual Art, 1960-1976, 2009, page 23-34 (online text partly available at Google Books)

References

External links 
 In memoriam: Adriaan van Ravesteijn, Stedelijk Museum Amsterdam

1938 births
2015 deaths
Dutch art dealers
Art collectors from Amsterdam
Delft University of Technology alumni